Ivan Lendl defeated Vitas Gerulaitis in the final, 6–7(5–7), 2–6, 7–6(8–6), 6–2, 6–4 to win the singles title at the 1981 Volvo Masters.

Björn Borg was the defending champion, but did not participate.

Draw

Finals

Group A
 Standings are determined by: 1. number of wins; 2. number of matches; 3. in two-players-ties, head-to-head records; 4. in three-players-ties, percentage of sets won, or of games won; 5. steering-committee decision.

Group B
 Standings are determined by: 1. number of wins; 2. number of matches; 3. in two-players-ties, head-to-head records; 4. in three-players-ties, percentage of sets won, or of games won; 5. steering-committee decision.

See also
ATP World Tour Finals appearances

References
1981 Masters-Singles

Singles